Sgòr Gaoith ('windy peak') is a mountain peak in the far western massif of the Cairngorms in the Scottish Highlands. The ridge is separated from the Braeriach massif to the east by Glen Eanaich and Loch Eanaich. 

The name 'Sgòr Gaoith' also refers to the mountain as a whole. The other summits of the mountain are Sgòran Dubh Mòr (1,111 m high) to the north, and Càrn Bàn Mòr (1052 m high) to the south. The eastern side of Sgòr Gaoith is girded by steep cliffs which plunge down to Loch Eanaich; the western side is composed of heather slopes and a number of shallow corries.

The two most commonly used routes up Sgòr Gaoith start from Glen Feshie to the west. One ascends the mountain via a track starting in the pine woods, leading up into Coire Ruadh and thence to the summit by a number of indistinct paths. The other starts further south down Glen Feshie from a car-park just before the farm of Achlean and reaches the summit via the lower peak of Carn Ban Mòr (1,052 m).

References

Badenoch and Strathspey
Marilyns of Scotland
Munros
Mountains and hills of the Cairngorms
Mountains and hills of Highland (council area)
Mountains and hills of Aberdeenshire
One-thousanders of Scotland